Ottawa Township is located in LaSalle County, Illinois. As of the 2010 census, its population was 11,766 and it contained 5,601 housing units.

Geography

Demographics

Government
Ottawa Township is the center of the county government, with an Appellate Court branch, the County Courthouse, and County Offices  located within Ottawa proper and within Ottawa Township.

References

External links
US Census
City-data.com
Illinois State Archives

Townships in LaSalle County, Illinois
Populated places established in 1849
Townships in Illinois
1849 establishments in Illinois